Blastomonas is a Gram-negative, photoheterotrophic, strictly aerobic and non-spore-forming bacteria genus from the family of Sphingomonadaceae.

References

Further reading 
 
 
 

Sphingomonadales
Bacteria genera